Piwnice may refer to the following places in Poland:

Piwnice, Kuyavian-Pomeranian Voivodeship
Piwnice, Pomeranian Voivodeship
Piwnice Wielkie
Piwnice Astronomical Observatory